Noemí Gerstein (November 10, 1910 – June 14, 1996) was an Argentine sculptor, illustrator and plastic artist.

Noemí Gerstein was born November 10, 1910, in Buenos Aires, where she continued to live and work.
In 1934, she began training under Alfredo Bigatti In the 1950s, she received a government grant to travel to France, where she studied at the Académie de la Grande Chaumière in Paris under the tutelage of Ossip Zadkine. In 1952, Gerstein was one of the winners of the Institute of Contemporary Arts' design competition for the Unknown Political Prisoner Monument. Gerstein's works were predominantly abstract, and she "experimented with new materials." She had a preference for metallic constructions, such as Constellation (1963), which used small pieces of tubing. She died June 14, 1996.

Selected works
 Monumento al prisionero político desconocido (1953)
 Madre e hijo (1953)
 Maternidad (1954)
 La familia (En ocasiones llamada "El Oráculo") (1960)
 El samurai (1961)
 Los amantes (1961)
 Nacimiento (1961)
 Goliath (1961–62)
 Meteorito (1969)
 Achiras (1973)
 L’Art et L’Homme (1974)
 Seoane Músicos
 Milagro de la vida 
 Seres híbridos  (1978)

Awards
 1982, Konex Foundation Platinum Award - non-figurative sculpture

References

External links
Noemí Gerstein at Konex Foundation 
Museo Nacional de Bellas Artes' article 
Clarín's article 
El Arca article 

1910 births
1996 deaths
20th-century Argentine women artists
20th-century Argentine sculptors
Argentine illustrators
Argentine women illustrators
Argentine women sculptors
Artists from Buenos Aires
Alumni of the Académie de la Grande Chaumière
Argentine Jews
Burials at La Chacarita Cemetery